Masterjam is the platinum-selling eighth studio album by funk band Rufus (and their fifth album featuring singer Chaka Khan), their debut on the MCA Records label following their purchase and dissolution of ABC Records, released in 1979.

History
Produced by Quincy Jones, Masterjam was the band's fourth album to top Billboards R&B Albums chart, and also reached number 14 on thePop chart. The album includes the singles "Do You Love What You Feel", their fourth #1 hit on the R&B Singles chart and also #30 on Pop, "Any Love" (US R&B #24, 1980) and "I'm Dancing for Your Love" (US R&B #43, 1980).  In 1979, Chaka Khan found solo success with the release of the album, Chaka, and its parent single, "I'm Every Woman", which became her signature song years before "I Feel for You".

However, Khan wanted to remain a member of her long-standing band Rufus, a group she had joined in 1972. Since their 1973 debut, Khan had led on most of the group's songs. While Ron Stockert, an earlier member, had added vocals to the debut and their follow-up, Rags to Rufus, Stockert left after complaining of their label's focus on Khan, and Tony Maiden would begin to lead on more songs as the seventies drew to a close, Khan's presence continued to boost the group.

For their first album with MCA Records, which had absorbed ABC Records a year before, the group enlisted Jones to help them with the record (Khan had recorded with Jones the year before for his album Sounds...and Stuff Like That!!). The group, while still with Khan, was now starting to record without her, while Khan was starting to express a view of going solo for good while still performing with the group onstage. Despite this, the album became a success upon its release.  Following Masterjam Chaka Khan recorded her second solo album Naughty and Rufus Party 'Til You're Broke, released in 1980 and 1981 respectively.  Khan reunited with the band again in 1981 for the recording of Camouflage.

Jones had also brought in the Seawind Horns for help, as well as the Brothers Johnson for additional percussion help.  Rufus even does a funked-up cover of Jones's own "Body Heat".

Track listing

Personnel
Chaka Khan – lead vocals, background vocals
Tony Maiden – guitar, vocals
Kevin Murphy – keyboards
John Robinson – drums, additional percussion, hand-clapping
Bobby Watson – bass 
David "Hawk" Wolinski – keyboards
Seawind – horns
Jerry Hey, Gary Grant, Larry Hall – trumpet, flugelhorn
Kim Hutchcroft, Larry Williams – saxophone, flute
Bill Reichenbach Jr., Lew McCreary – trombone
Louis Johnson, George Johnson, Richard Heath – percussion, hand-clappingProductionQuincy Jones – producer
Bruce Swedien – audio engineer, mixing
Jerry Hey, Bill Reichenbach Jr. – string arrangements
Sidney Sharp – strings concertmaster
Rufus – rhythm arrangements 
Rod Temperton – rhythm arrangements, vocal arrangements
Chaka Khan, Tony Maiden – vocal arrangements
Ed Caraeff - photography, album design

ChartsAlbumSingles'''

See also
List of Billboard number-one R&B albums of 1979

References

External linksMasterjam'' at Discogs

1979 albums
Rufus (band) albums
Chaka Khan albums
Albums produced by Quincy Jones
MCA Records albums